Otto Ciliax (30 October 1891 – 12 December 1964) was a German naval officer who served in the navies of the German Empire, the Weimar Republic and Nazi Germany. As an admiral during World War II, he commanded the German battleships. He was a recipient of the Knight's Cross of the Iron Cross.

Early life and career
Ciliax was born on 30 October 1891 in Neudietendorf, at the time part of Saxe-Coburg and Gotha. He joined the military service of the Imperial German Navy on 1 April 1910 as a Seekadett of "Crew 1910" (the incoming class of 1910). Onboard training on Victory Louise began on 13 May before he was transferred to the Naval Academy Mürwik on 1 April 1911 for the main cadet and officer course. Afterwards, starting on 1 October 1912 he served on the battleship  and was promoted to Leutnant zur See (acting sub-lieutenant/ensign) on 27 September 1913.

World War I
Ciliax was still serving on Hannover when World War I broke out on 28 July 1914. He was a watch officer on  when it sank the cruiser  on 19 August 1916.

Between the wars
He remained with the Reichsmarine after the German collapse of 1918, serving as torpedo boat commander and staff officer, heading the operations department (Operationsabteilung) of the Naval High Command (Oberkommando der Marine) in 1936. He commanded the  when war broke out in September 1939.

World War II

In June 1941 he became Type Commander, Battleships (Befehlshaber der Schlachtschiffe). In this position he commanded Operation Cerberus, better known as "the Channel Dash", when German battleships Scharnhorst and Gneisenau and the heavy cruiser Prinz Eugen and a number of other smaller vessels were transferred from Brest to their respective home bases in Germany for planned deployment to Norwegian waters in February 1942. Ciliax flew his flag on Scharnhorst. Although the success of the operation was seen as an embarrassment to the British because the ships were able to pass through the English Channel almost undetected (though both Scharnhorst and Gneisenau struck a minefield en route), the transfer from Brest to Germany eliminated the threat they had posed to Allied shipping in the Atlantic. From March 1943 until April 1945 Ciliax was Commander-in-Chief of German naval forces in Norway (Marinekommando Norwegen).

Awards

 Iron Cross (1914)
 2nd Class (13 June 1916)
 1st Class (6 November 1916)
 Knight's Cross Second Class of the Ducal Saxe-Ernestine House Order with Swords
 Military Merit Cross 3rd class with war decoration (Austria-Hungary)
 U-boat War Badge (1918)
 Wehrmacht Long Service Award 4th to 1st Class (2 October 1936)
 Spanish Cross in Gold with Swords (6 June 1939)
 Clasp to the Iron Cross (1939)
 2nd Class (January 1940)
 1st Class (April 1940)
 Commander's Cross of the Order of the Crown of Italy (11 March 1941)
 Medal for the Campaign of 1936−1939 (Spain)
 German Cross in Gold on 20 November 1941 as Vizeadmiral and commander of the battleships
 Knight's Cross of the Iron Cross on 21 March 1942 as Vizeadmiral and commander of the battleships
 High Seas Fleet Badge (1941)

Promotions

Translation notes

References

Citations

Bibliography

 
 
 
 
 
 

1891 births
1964 deaths
People from Gotha (district)
People from Saxe-Coburg and Gotha
U-boat commanders (Imperial German Navy)
Admirals of the Kriegsmarine
German military personnel of the Spanish Civil War
Recipients of the Gold German Cross
Recipients of the clasp to the Iron Cross, 1st class
Recipients of the Knight's Cross of the Iron Cross
Imperial German Navy personnel of World War I
Military personnel from Thuringia